On the Rocks was an XM Satellite Radio online exclusive music channel. It had a format featuring vocal and instrumental lounge music, predominantly from the 1950s and '60s. On The Rocks was one of the few XM-programmed music channels completely devoid of on-air personalities.

The channel was originally featured as part of XM's regular satellite lineup, but was removed in July 2004 to make room for other music channels.  XM had previously pre-empted On The Rocks for its "Holly" Christmas music format in December 2003. It was removed from the XM online lineup in July 2008.

See also
XM Satellite Radio channel history

References

Defunct radio stations in the United States
Radio stations established in 2001
Radio stations disestablished in 2008